There have been 625 modern Olympians (including Paralympians, Summer Olympic athletes and artists, and Winter Olympians) who have identified as lesbian, gay, bisexual, transgender, pansexual, non-binary, queer, and/or having an intersex condition, or who have openly been in a same-sex relationship. The first Olympic Games in which an athlete now known to be LGBT+ competed was the 1900 Summer Olympics, also the first LGBT+ Olympic medalist and first contemporaneously out Olympian. The 1932 Summer Olympics was the first instance of an athlete now known to be intersex competing, also winning a medal. LGBT+ Olympians have contested events across over 60 sports, as well as several artistic events. The majority of LGBT+ Olympians are female. The Olympic sport with the most LGBT+ participants is football. The nation with the most out LGBT+ Olympians is the United States, including two who have also competed for other nations.

The most decorated LGBT+ Olympian is British Paralympic equestrian Lee Pearson, with 17 medals including 14 golds; the most decorated able-bodied LGBT+ Olympian is Dutch speed skater Ireen Wüst, with 13 medals including 6 golds; the most decorated able-bodied LGBT+ Summer Olympian is Australian swimmer Ian Thorpe, with 9 medals including 5 golds. LGBT+ Olympians who hold Olympic records include Wüst; footballers Pia Sundhage and Vivianne Miedema; rower Emma Twigg; and triple jumper Yulimar Rojas, who also holds the world record.

Overview

LGBTQ+ Summer Olympians

Helena Åberg
Tifanny Abreu
Yenny Acuña
Nicola Adams
Francilla Agar
Marilyn Agliotti
Michelle-Lee Ahye
Elissa Alarie
Aline
Julie Allemand
Andressa Alves
Anja Andersen
Camilla Andersen
Emanuel Andrade
Ramsey Angela
Filippa Angeldahl
Nadine Angerer
Alyson Annan
Geisa Arcanjo
Bárbara Arenhart
Judith Arndt
Karriss Artingstall
Anita Asante
Maja Åström
Seimone Augustus
Jennifer Azzi
Leo Baker
Bárbara
Shawnacy Barber
Karen Bardsley
Betty Baxter
Jolyn Beer
Alice Bellandi
Perris Benegas
Brittany Benn
Kajsa Bergqvist
Sue Bird
Nathalie Björn
Carl Blasco
Miriam Blasco
Lucilla Boari
Tom Bosworth
Erica Bougard
Sabine Braun
Kelly Brazier
Linda Bresonik
Lucy Bronze
Gayle Broughton
Rachele Bruni
Kadeisha Buchanan
Amandine Buchard
Saskia Budgett
Anne Buijs
Niels Bukh
Kris Burley
Balian Buschbaum
Karin Büttner-Janz
Ally Carda
Ellie Carpenter
Marjorie Carpréaux
Cecilia Carranza Saroli
Peter Caruth
Sherry Cassuto
Rut Castillo
Isadora Cerullo
Mark Chatfield
Dutee Chand
Kendall Chase
Darren Chiacchia
Amanda Chidester
Layshia Clarendon
Dominic Clarke
Kerron Clement
Aoife Cooke
Natalie Cook
Rose Cossar
Robert Costello
Scott Cranham
Cristiane
Amanda Cromwell
Orlando Cruz
Ana Marcela Cunha
Nina Cutro-Kelly
Soren Dahl
Lisa Dahlkvist
Tom Daley
Katy Daley-McLean
Rachel Daly
Eleni Daniilidou
Ana Carolina da Silva
Izabela da Silva
Tierna Davidson
Debinha
Chantal de Bruijn
Gabriela DeBues-Stafford
Anouk Dekker
Irene de Kok
Casey Dellacqua
Elena Delle Donne
Valerie Demey
Alex Di Giorgio
Margielyn Didal
Babe Didrikson Zaharias
Carlien Dirkse van den Heuvel
Stefanie Dolson
Gia Doonan
Robert Dover
Anton Down-Jenkins
Lauren Doyle
Charlotte Drury
Cathrine Dufour
Greg Duhaime
Céline Dumerc
Katie Duncan
Imke Duplitzer
Taylor Edwards
Paola Egonu
Andri Eleftheriou
Norman Elder
Jill Ellis
Rashida Ellis
Christiane Endler
Abby Erceg
Magdalena Eriksson
Terence Etherton
Nicola Fairbrother
Jennifer Falk
Gigi Fernández
Michelle Ferris
Marina Fioravanti
Nilla Fischer
Sisca Folkertsma
Amini Fonua
Formiga
Mark Foster
Larissa França
Adrianna Franch
Francielle
Larissa Franklin
Lawrence Keith Frostad
Edward Gal
Vicky Galindo
Carol Gattaz
Regina George
Emily Gielnik
Kirsty Gilmour
Paula Ginzo
Élodie Godin
Jasmin Grabowski
Chelsea Gray
Ellia Green
Kelly Griffin
Brittney Griner
Inka Grings
Annie Guglia
Víctor Gutiérrez
Astrid Guyart
Peter Häggström
Nathalie Hagman
Gro Hammerseng
Kellie Harrington
Ashlyn Harris
Jessica Harrison
Tone Haugen
Bruce Hayes
Tobin Heath
Nicole Heavirland
Mathew Helm
Lauren Hemp
Mélanie Henique
Isabell Herlovsen
Laurie Hernandez
Raz Hershko
Carl Hester
Kelly Holmes
Michelle Heyman
Ursula Holl
Laurel Hubbard
Angela Hucles
Karen Hultzer
Mia Hundvin
Maarten Hurkmans
Lina Hurtig
Svenja Huth
Diego Hypólito
Sophie Ingle
Letícia Izidoro
Colin Jackson
Aleksandra Jarmolińska
Patrick Jeffrey
Caitlyn Jenner
Daniel Jervis
Megan Jones
Sarah Jones
Steffi Jones
Natasha Kai
Ebrar Karakurt
Daria Kasatkina
Alev Kelter
Johan Kenkhuis
Alanna Kennedy
Sam Kerr
Isabel Kerschowski
Emma Kete
Lotte Kiærskou
Billie Jean King
Fran Kirby
Sandra Kirby
Jen Kish
Valentina Kogan
Dominik Koll
Daniel Kowalski
Katarina Kowplos
Katja Kraus
Ali Krieger
Emma Kullberg
Luca Kumahara
Stephanie Labbé
Alexandra Lacrabère
Kim Lammers
Holly Lam-Moores
Ghislaine Landry
Jessica Landström
Lauren Lappin
Marjorie Larney
Marion Lay
Mark Leduc
Evy Leibfarth
Malin Levenstad
Danell Leyva
Silvana Lima
Hedvig Lindahl
Lori Lindsey
Renate Lingor
Ari-Pekka Liukkonen
Chloe Logarzo
Greg Louganis
Fritzi Löwy
Sabrina Lozada-Cabbage
Kaili Lukan
Joey Lye
Sofía Maccari
Irish Magno
Florence Maheu
Robbie Manson
Arthur Mariano
Brian Marshall
Marta
Conchita Martínez
Diana Matheson
Ian Matos
Amélie Mauresmo
Marnie McBean
Haylie McCleney
Angel McCoughtry
Susan McGreivy
Erin McLeod
Inika McPherson
Linda Medalen
Lauren Meece
Ioannis Melissanidis
Kim Mestdagh
Holly Metcalf
Kristie Mewis
Teagan Micah
Domien Michiels
Vivianne Miedema
Hans Peter Minderhoud
Kayla Miracle
Matthew Mitcham
Leilani Mitchell
Portia Modise
Robert de Montesquiou
Carmelina Moscato
Sofía Mulánovich
Nadine Müller
Eefje Muskens
Leigh-Ann Naidoo
Marie-Ève Nault
Martina Navratilova
Ashley Nee
Robert Newton
Bente Nordby
Jana Novotná
Katja Nyberg
Kate O'Brien
Paul O'Brien
Tzipora Obziler
Jolanta Ogar
Grace O'Hanlon
Kelley O'Hara
Meghan O'Leary
Inger Pors Olsen
Poppy Starr Olsen
Robert Páez
Candace Parker
Kaia Parnaby
Maartje Paumen
Christinna Pedersen
Shaina Pellington
Otto Peltzer
Fiona Pennie
Carole Péon
Mayssa Pessoa
Nesthy Petecio
Babett Peter
Beate Peters
Anna Petrakova
Mason Phelps Jr
Erin Phillips
David Pichler
Fernanda Pinilla
Rafael Polinario
Nadia Podoroska
Jillion Potter
Natalie Powell
Christen Press
Lauren Price
Bev Priestman
Peter Prijdekker
Celia Quansah
Quinn
Megan Rapinoe
Lisa Raymond
Mel Reid
Helen Richardson-Walsh
Kate Richardson-Walsh
Yoreli Rincón
Hannah Roberts
Robbie Rogers
Craig Rogerson
Yulimar Rojas
Trine Rønning
Caitlin Rooskrantz
Petra Rossner
Olivier Rouyer
Leif Rovsing
Kamilla Rytter Juhl
Alexis Sablone
Dayshalee Salamán
Senni Salminen
Victoria Sandell Svensson
Raven Saunders
Tessie Savelkouls
Lotta Schelin
Demi Schuurs
Alex Scott
Jill Scott
Briana Scurry
Caroline Seger
Guenter Seidel
Linda Sembrant
Caster Semenya
Reidun Seth
Alena Sharp
Kailen Sheridan
Rafaela Silva
Georgia Simmerling
Jimmy Sjödin
Katarzyna Skorupa
Rikke Skov
Alana Smith
Kelly Smith
Douglas Souza
Sherida Spitse
Guusje Steenhuis
Helen Stephens
Breanna Stewart
Demi Stokes
Casey Stoney
Beth Storry
Samantha Stosur
Martina Strutz
Rennae Stubbs
Carla Suárez
Erica Sullivan
Pia Sundhage
Annica Svensson
Sheryl Swoopes
Stacy Sykora
Blyth Tait
Melissa Tancredi
Diana Taurasi
Penny Taylor
Arjen Teeuwissen
Carly Telford
Irma Testa
Ina-Yoko Teutenberg
Mark Tewksbury
Carole Thate
Jessica Thoennes
Kristen Thomas
Markus Thormeyer
Ian Thorpe
Sara Thunebro
Ellen Tomek
Gearoid Towey
Susannah Townsend
Ruby Tui
Marc Tur
Emma Twigg
Anissa Urtez
Daniëlle van de Donk
Stefanie van der Gragt
Marieke van der Wal
Shanice van de Sanden
Sanne van Dijke
Merel van Dongen
Marleen van Iersel
Alison Van Uytvanck
Janine van Wyk
Elke Vanhoof
Júlia Vasconcelos
Dan Veatch
Anne Veenendaal
Julian Venonsky
Lena Videkull
Sunette Viljoen
Linda Villumsen
Lisa-Marie Vizaniari
Tom Waddell
Nick Wagman
Kira Walkenhorst
Ji Wallace
Michaela Walsh
Sarah Walsh
Abby Wambach
Jeffrey Wammes
Haleigh Washington
Ann Wauters
Saskia Webber
Rowie Webster
Hannah Wilkinson
Leah Wilkinson
Rhian Wilkinson
Fara Williams
Sharni Williams
Leah Williamson
Hayley Wilson
Spencer Wilton
Chris Witty
Chelsea Wolfe
Portia Woodman
Jack Woolley
Marta Xargay
Kirsty Yallop
Tameka Yallop
Shelina Zadorsky
Katarzyna Zillmann

LGBTQ+ Winter Olympians

Erin Ambrose
Filippo Ambrosini
Gillian Apps
Kévin Aymoz
Megan Bankes
Ebba Berglund
Andrew Blaser
Brian Boitano
Brittany Bowe
Belle Brockhoff
Jason Brown
Anastasia Bucsis
Jeffrey Buttle
Caitlin Cahow
Alex Carpenter
Julie Chu
Callan Chythlook-Sifsof
Guillaume Cizeron
Emily Clark
Robin Cousins
Toller Cranston
John Curry
Mélodie Daoust
Nancy Drolet
Meghan Duggan
John Fennell
Randy Gardner
Makayla Gerken Schofield
Lewis Gibson
Amber Glenn
Timothy Goebel
Joan Guetschow
Michi Halilović
Jayna Hefford
Jorik Hendrickx
Edel Therese Høiseth
Erika Holst
Daniela Iraschko-Stolz
Brianne Jenner
Barbara Jezeršek
Breezy Johnson
Kathleen Kauth
Gus Kenworthy
Christopher Kinney
Stine Brun Kjeldaas
Anna Kjellbin
Hilary Knight
Charline Labonté
Aneta Lédlová
Timothy LeDuc
Ylva Lindberg
Alysa Liu
Cheryl Maas
Robert McCall
Simona Meiler
Kim Meylemans
Eric Mitchell
Bruce Mouat
Sandra Näslund
Ondrej Nepela
Ryan O'Meara
Brian Orser
Caroline Ouellette
Šárka Pančochová
Anja Pärson
Brian Pockar
Paul Poirier
Simon Proulx-Sénécal
Eric Radford
Emilia Ramboldt
Jamie Lee Rattray
Javier Raya
Adam Rippon
Ronald Robertson
Angela Ruggiero
Jill Saulnier
Matthew Savoie
Ronja Savolainen
Nicole Silveira
Georgia Simmerling
Blake Skjellerup
Vibeke Skofterud
Tricia Stumpf
Fumie Suguri
Sarah Vaillancourt
Sanne van Kerkhof
Sophie Vercruyssen
Kaitlyn Weaver
Johnny Weir
Stacy Wilson
Marieke Wijsman
Chris Witty
Lara Wolf
Ireen Wüst
Natalia Zabiiako
Micah Zandee-Hart

LGBTQ+ Paralympians

Jen Armbruster
Tuany Barbosa Siqueira
Monique Burkland
Hailey Danz
Abby Dunkin
Katie-George Dunlevy
Kaitlyn Eaton
Edênia Garcia
Megan Giglia
Theresa Goh
Laura Goodkind
Barbara Gross
Jude Hamer
Claire Harvey
Terry Hayes
Querijn Hensen
Allison Jones
Bo Kramer
Robyn Lambird
Crystal Lane-Wright
Josiane Lima
Tara Llanes
Robyn Love
Angela Madsen
Alana Maldonado
Débora Menezes
Asya Miller
Desiree Miller
Mareike Miller
Ness Murby
Kate O'Brien
Brenda Osnaya
Cindy Ouellet
Lee Pearson
Rafael Polinario
Mariana Ribeiro
Lucy Robinson
Lauren Rowles
Courtney Ryan
Moran Samuel
Monica Sereda
Lucy Shuker
Hallie Smith
Maz Strong
Marieke Vervoort
Stephanie Wheeler
Emma Wiggs
Laurie Williams

Intersex athletes

Dutee Chand
Ewa Kłobukowska
Beatrice Masilingi
Christine Mboma
Francine Niyonsaba
Heinrich Ratjen
Caster Semenya
Aminatou Seyni
Edinanci Silva
Pedro Spajari
Stanisława Walasiewicz
Margaret Wambui

LGBTQ+ artists

Delmar Banner
Walter Battiss
Arno Breker
Gabriele D'Annunzio
Roy De Maistre
Thomas Eakins
Fanie Eloff
Beatrice Fenton
Harriet Whitney Frishmuth
Vincenzo Gemito
Robert Graves
Ludwig von Hofmann
Winslow Homer
Anna Hyatt Huntington
Eleuter Iwaszkiewicz
Mainie Jellett
Harald Kreutzberg
Henry de Montherlant
Jan Parandowski
Brenda Putnam
Janet Scudder
Renée Sintenis
Carl Sprinchorn
Milly Steger
Ernst van Heerden
Mary Wigman
Ángel Zárraga

See also
LGBT issues at the Olympic and Paralympic Games
List of LGBT sportspeople

Notes

References 

LGBT sportspeople
Lists of LGBT-related people
LGBT